The Granite County Jail, located on Kearney St. in Philipsburg in Granite County, Montana, was built in 1896.  It was added to the National Register of Historic Places in 1980.

It is a red brick building which was still in use as a jail in 1980.

References

National Register of Historic Places in Granite County, Montana
Victorian architecture in Montana
Government buildings completed in 1896
Jails on the National Register of Historic Places in Montana
1896 establishments in Montana